The Virgin of the Rosary Cathedral also called Abancay Cathedral is the name that receives a religious building that is affiliated with the Catholic Church and is located in the city of Abancay in the Department of Apurímac southeast of the South American country of Peru.

The building probably began to be built in the year 1645, during the time when the territory was a Spanish colony. The construction has undergone modifications in its structure and parts several times. The cathedral is characterized by simple architecture, has a single tower with a belfry. In 1970 the current building was completely remodeled. In October of each year are celebrated the feasts in honor to the Virgin Mary in its invocation of the Rosary.-

It is under the pastoral responsibility of Bishop Gilberto Gómez González.

See also
 Roman Catholicism in Peru
 Virgin of the Rosary

References

Roman Catholic cathedrals in Peru
Roman Catholic churches completed in 1645
17th-century Roman Catholic church buildings in Peru